is a Japanese professional baseball outfielder for the Yokohama DeNA BayStars in Japan's Nippon Professional Baseball.

Professional career

Hokkaido Nippon-Ham Fighters
On 2 November 2016, it was revealed that Ohta had been included in a trade with the Hokkaido Nippon-Ham Fighters with team mate Katsuhiko Kumon for Fighters pitcher Mitsuo Yoshikawa and Shingo Ishikawa.

He selected . Ohta became a free agent following the 2021 season.

On December 20, 2021, Ohta signed with the Yokohama DeNA BayStars of Nippon Professional Baseball.

References

External links

NPB.com

1990 births
Hokkaido Nippon-Ham Fighters players
Japanese baseball players
Living people
Nippon Professional Baseball first basemen
Nippon Professional Baseball outfielders
Nippon Professional Baseball third basemen
Baseball people from Hiroshima Prefecture
Yomiuri Giants players
Yokohama DeNA BayStars players